Stephanoidea is a superfamily of parasitic wasps within the Apocrita, it includes only one living family, Stephanidae (350 living species mid Cretaceous-recent), as well as the extinct families Ephialtitidae (89 species, Early Jurassic-mid Cretaceous), Aptenoperissidae (8 species, mid Cretaceous, Burmese amber), Myanmarinidae (4 species, mid Cretaceous, Burmese amber) and Ohlhoffiidae (4 species, Early-mid Cretaceous).

References

Apocrita
Insect superfamilies